Ivan Ivanovich Yershov (born 22 May 1979) is a former Russian professional footballer.

Club career
He made his debut in the Russian Premier League in 2001 for FC Chernomorets Novorossiysk. He played 2 games in the UEFA Cup 2001–02 with FC Chernomorets Novorossiysk.

In September 2018, he tested positive for trimetazidine and meldonium, admitted his use and was banned pending further investigation.

References

External links
 Player page by sportbox.ru  
 

1979 births
Living people
People from Murmansk Oblast
Russian footballers
Association football defenders
Russian Premier League players
Russian expatriate footballers
Expatriate footballers in Ukraine
FC Chernomorets Novorossiysk players
FC Lada-Tolyatti players
FC Metallurg Lipetsk players
FC Volgar Astrakhan players
FC Arsenal Tula players
Doping cases in association football
Russian sportspeople in doping cases
Sportspeople from Murmansk Oblast